Ramonia is a genus of lichenized fungi in the family Gyalectaceae. It contains 24 species. The genus was circumscribed by  Ernst Stizenberger in 1862.

The genus name of Ramonia is in honour of Ramón Dionisio José de la Sagra (1798–1871), who was a Spanish anarchist, politician, writer, and botanist who founded the world's first anarchist journal, El Porvenir (Spanish for "The Future").

Species

Ramonia athallina 
Ramonia calcicola 
Ramonia chrysophaea 
Ramonia cupellina 
Ramonia dictyospora 
Ramonia elixii 
Ramonia elongata 
Ramonia eungellae 
Ramonia extensa 
Ramonia himelbrantii 
Ramonia leptospora 
Ramonia melathelia 
Ramonia microspora 
Ramonia minima 
Ramonia nepalensis 
Ramonia nigra 
Ramonia subantarctica 
Ramonia valenzueliana 
Ramonia variespora 
Ramonia vermispora 
Ramonia xylophila

References

Gyalectales
Lichen genera
Gyalectales genera
Taxa named by Ernst Stizenberger
Taxa described in 1862